Limey is a slang nickname for a British person. It may also refer to:

The Limey, a 1999 American crime film
Limey (band), an English pop/rock band
Limey (mixtape), the debut mixtape by Rainy Milo
Limey-Remenauville, a commune in Meurthe-et-Moselle, France
Limey Way, a challenge walk through Derbyshire, England

See also
Limay (disambiguation)
Limeyrat